The Immaculate Conception Rectory is a historic former Roman Catholic rectory building at 108 Beach Street in Revere, Massachusetts.  It is a -story Colonial Revival wood-frame structure, with a hipped slate roof and clapboard siding.  The main facade is divided into three sections, the outer ones consisting of curved bays with two windows at each level, with a balustrade above at the roof level.  The central section has the main entrance, sheltered by porch supported by grouped columns, with a balcony above.  Three-part windows stand at the second and third level above the entrance, with a pair of gabled dormers piercing the roof.

The building was listed on the National Register of Historic Places in 2002.  It served as the parish rectory until 1993, when the building was traded to the city in exchange for land across Beach Street, consolidating the church's land holdings.  Today the building houses the Museum of the Revere Society for Cultural and Historic Preservation. Immaculate Conception Church, located at 133 Beach Street, is still an active parish.

Gallery

See also
National Register of Historic Places listings in Suffolk County, Massachusetts

References

Properties of religious function on the National Register of Historic Places in Massachusetts
Buildings and structures in Suffolk County, Massachusetts
Revere, Massachusetts
Churches completed in 1901
Houses completed in 1901
Colonial Revival architecture in Massachusetts
National Register of Historic Places in Suffolk County, Massachusetts